Vale do Paraíso is a municipality located in the Brazilian state of Rondônia. Its population was 6,656 (2020) and its area is 966 km2.

References

Municipalities in Rondônia